Lisa Ponomar (born 21 May 1997) is a German former tennis player.

She has a career-high singles ranking of No. 630, achieved on 21 May 2018. On 23 October 2017, she peaked at No. 328 in the doubles rankings.

Ponomar made her WTA Tour main-draw debut at the 2018 Dubai Tennis Championships in the doubles draw, partnering Eden Silva.

ITF finals

Singles: 4 (2 titles, 2 runner–ups)

Doubles: 17 (6 titles, 11 runner-ups)
{|
|- valign=top
|

References

External links
 
 

1997 births
Living people
German female tennis players
Tennis players from Hamburg
People from Stormarn (district)